Kryoneri is a village and a community of the Lagkadas municipality. Before the 2011 local government reform it was part of the municipality of Sochos, of which it was a municipal district. The 2011 census recorded 991 inhabitants in village and 1,310 inhabitants in the community. The community of Kryoneri covers an area of 58.655 km2.

Administrative division
The community of Kryoneri consists of two separate settlements: 
Avgi (population 319)
Kryoneri (population 991)
The aforementioned population figures are as of 2011.

See also
List of settlements in the Thessaloniki regional unit

References

Populated places in Thessaloniki (regional unit)